The 1st Regiment California Volunteer Infantry was an infantry regiment in the Union Army during the American Civil War. It spent its entire term of service in the western United States.

History
Most of the 1st California was recruited from August to October 1861, with the exception of Company K, which was organized the following February.  Many of its companies were formed from companies of the California Militia taken intact into federal service others from individuals drawn from the militia.  James H. Carleton served as colonel, Joseph R. West as lieutenant colonel and Edwin A. Rigg as major.  It came under the command of the Department of the Pacific (later it would come under the Department of New Mexico).  After some training at Camp Downy near Oakland and Camp Latham near Los Angeles.  Companies D, F and G were sent to establish and garrison Camp Wright, in November 1861.  Detachments from the camp captured Daniel Showalter's party near Warner's Ranch, November 20–29, 1861.  In December, 1861, five companies of the regiment were sent to Fort Yuma on the Colorado River and the others to various posts around Southern California.

The regiment was assigned to a force called the California Column, which was commanded by Carleton and composed of one infantry regiment (the 5th) and parts of two cavalry regiments (the 1st and 2nd) of California volunteers and a company of Regular artillery.  The Column was formed to drive the Confederate Army of New Mexico out of the eastern part of the New Mexico Territory. Due to supply problems, the force did not move out until February 1862.  The 1st Infantry saw fighting at the Battle of Picacho Pass (only Company I) and the Battle of Apache Pass (this battle was against Apache warriors, not Confederates).  The regiment continued marching across the New Mexico Territory to Fort Craig.  Picacho Pass was the only engagement against Confederate forces, since they had retreated back into Texas before the California Column reached eastern New Mexico and they made no attempt to recover the territory they lost.

For the remainder of the war, the 1st California Infantry was engaged in garrison duty dispersed in posts across New Mexico Territory and Texas and fighting Apache and Navajo Indians in these places and in the Utah Territory.  The unit was mustered out on October 21, 1866.

1st California Regiment of Infantry Commanders
 Colonel James H. Carleton August 19, 1861 - June 1, 1862
 Colonel Joseph R. West June 1, 1862 - April 1864 
 Colonel Edwin A. Rigg April 1864 - December 1864

Lineage
The lineage of the 1st California continued with the formation of the Coast Artillery Corps (CAC), California National Guard (CANG) on 19 April 1909. Subsequently, this unit was redesignated as the 1st Coast Defense Command (CDC) (1917), 1st Provisional Battalion, CAC, CANG (date unknown), 1st CDC (1921), 250th Coast Artillery (1923), and in 1924 became the 250th Coast Artillery Regiment (Tractor Drawn), which served in World War II.

Company assignments
 Headquarters: At Camp Union from September 1861 to March 1862 when it moved to Camp Wright, then for a short time was at Drum Barracks before joining the California Column's march across southern New Mexico Territory to Texas.  There it occupied Franklin, Texas until the regiment was mustered out in December 1864.
 Company A, Formed largely from men of the California Volunteers, California Militia of Oroville. 
 Company B, Formed largely from men from the Marion Rifles and other militia companies in San Francisco and others recruited at Camp Latham, near Los Angeles. 
 Company C, Formed from the Amador Mountaineers, California Militia, Jackson.
 Company D, Formed from the San Jose Volunteers, California Militia, San Jose.
 Company E, Formed from the Washington Rifles, California Militia, Sacramento City & County.
 Company F, Formed from the Sierra Greys, California Militia, La Porte. 
 Company G, Formed from Company "H", California Militia from Nevada City, California.
 Company H, Formed largely from men from San Francisco.
 Company I, Formed largely from men from the Marysville Rifles of Marysville.
 Company K, Formed largely from men from San Francisco.

See also
List of California Civil War Union units

References

 California Military History Museum, Regiments of the California Volunteers in Federal Service, 1st Regiment of Infantry
 Military History Online, THE ADVANCE OF THE CALIFORNIA COLUMN TO ARIZONA AND NEW MEXICO.
 Masich, Andrew E., The Civil War in Arizona: the Story of the California Volunteers, 1861-65;  University of Oklahoma Press (Norman, 2006).

External links
 

Units and formations of the Union Army from California
Military units and formations of the United States in the Indian Wars
Military units and formations established in 1861
1861 establishments in California
Military units and formations disestablished in 1866
1866 disestablishments in the United States